The 2018 Junior World Weightlifting Championships were held in Tashkent, Uzbekistan at the Uzbekistan Sport Complex from 7 to 14 July 2018.

Team ranking

Medal overview

Men

Women

Medal table
Ranking by Big (Total result) medals
 

Ranking by all medals: Big (Total result) and Small (Snatch and Clean & Jerk)

Points

Participating nations

References

External links
Start Book
Regulations
Results
Results Book

IWF Junior World Weightlifting Championships
International weightlifting competitions hosted by Uzbekistan
2018 in weightlifting
Weightlifting in Uzbekistan
Sport in Tashkent
2018 in Uzbekistani sport
July 2018 sports events in Asia